The Bundok flycatcher (Ficedula luzoniensis) or thicket flycatcher, is a species of bird in the family Muscicapidae.
It is endemic to the Philippines.

Its natural habitat is subtropical or tropical moist lowland forests.

References

Bundok flycatcher
Endemic birds of the Philippines
Bundok flycatcher
Bundok flycatcher